The 2016 Citrus Bowl was an American college football bowl game played on January 1, 2016 at Camping World Stadium in Orlando, Florida. The 70th edition was one of the 2015–16 NCAA football bowl games that concluded the 2015 NCAA Division I FBS football season. The game was televised by ABC. It was sponsored by the Buffalo Wild Wings restaurant franchise and is officially known as the Buffalo Wild Wings Citrus Bowl.

Teams
The game featured the Michigan Wolverines of the Big Ten Conference, and the Florida Gators of the Southeastern Conference in their third meeting against each other, with all three matchups coming in January bowl games in Florida.

Michigan Wolverines

After finishing their regular season with a 9–3 record, the Wolverines were selected to their fifth Citrus Bowl appearance. This was their 44th bowl game appearance, tied for 11th-highest total all-time among FBS schools. Michigan won the previous meeting against the Florida Gators in the 2008 Capital One Bowl, by a score of 41–35.

Florida Gators

After finishing their regular season with a 10–3 record, the Gators were selected to their sixth Citrus Bowl appearance, tying them with Georgia for the most Citrus Bowl appearances. This was their 42nd bowl game appearance.

Game summary

Scoring Summary

Statistics

References

Citrus Bowl
Citrus Bowl (game)
Michigan Wolverines football bowl games
Florida Gators football bowl games
2010s in Orlando, Florida
2016 in sports in Florida
Citrus Bowl